Kamuzu Academy is a private boarding school in Malawi that was founded by, and named after, the late Hastings Kamuzu Banda, the former President of Malawi. It is described by its proponents as "The Eton of Africa".

In 1987, it was the subject of a BBC documentary entitled "The Eton of Africa" made by John Rae.

An idiosyncratic feature of the school is that from the beginning Latin was made a compulsory subject for all students, and is still taught today as a core subject up to IGCSE. Kamuzu Banda is recorded as saying: "This place is for classical education, Greek, Latin, particularly Latin. I want that to be clearly understood by everybody. If you don't like Latin, don't come here."

The 40th anniversary Founder's Day service in November 2021 was attended by President Lazarus Chakwera.

Notable alumni

Catherine Gotani Hara
Samson Kambalu
Chanju Samantha Mwale
Yolanda Kaunda

See also 
 List of boarding schools
 :Category:Alumni of Kamuzu Academy

References

External links 
 
 
 Kamuzu Academy at Malawi tourism
 Telegraph article "The man who saved the Eton of Africa"
 "The Eton of Africa" (BBC documentary, 1987)

Educational institutions established in 1981
Schools in Malawi
1981 establishments in Malawi